Shepheard may refer to:

Carole Shepheard (born 1945), New Zealand artist
John Shepheard (born 1981), British footballer
Peter Shepheard (1913–2002), British architect and landscape architect
Ryan Shepheard (born 1977), Australian soccer referee
Samuel Shepheard (died 1719), British Member of Parliament for Newport (Isle of Wight) and the City of London (father of Samuel Shepheard)
Samuel Shepheard (1677–1748), British Member of Parliament for Malmesbury, Cambridge and Cambridgeshire